KVRP-FM (97.1 MHz) is a commercial radio station in Haskell in the U.S. state of Texas, broadcasting to the Abilene, Texas, area.  KVRP-FM airs a country music format branded as "Big Country".

The station is owned by 1 Chronicles 14, L.P., which is based in San Antonio, Texas.

KVRP-FM is an affiliate of the Texas Tech Red Raiders and airs Texas Tech football, basketball and baseball.

References

External links
 Big Country 97.1 Twitter
 KVRP official website
 
 
 

Country radio stations in the United States
VRP-FM
Radio stations established in 1981